Favart is a French surname and may refer to:

People 
 Charles-Simon Favart (1710-1792), a French playwright
 Jean-Baptiste Favart (1726-1806), a French général
 Justine Favart (1727-1772), an operatic singer, actress, and dancer, the wife of the dramatist, Charles Simon Favart

Entertainment 
 Madame Favart, a French operetta by Jacques Offenbach